Baisha Township is a township in Changsha County, Changsha, Hunan Province, China. It administers ten villages and one community. Baisha town merged to Kaihui town on November 19, 2015.

References

Changsha County
Changsha County